Trifurcula montana is a moth of the family Nepticulidae. It is found in Spain and Sardinia.

The wingspan is 5.6-7.2 mm for males and 5.8-7.8 mm for females.

Adults have been collected at light from April to July in the mountains of Spain and Sardinia, between 600 and 2,000 meters above sea level, always close to Thymus vulgaris, the possible host plant.

External links
Seven New Species Of The Subgenus Glaucolepis Braun From Southern Europe (Lepidoptera: Nepticulidae, Trifurcula)

Nepticulidae
Moths described in 2007
Moths of Europe